2022 saw a rapid increase in food prices and shortages of food supplies around the world. The compounding crises in distinct parts of the world were caused by compounding geopolitical and economic crisis. The crises followed food security and economic crises during the COVID-19 pandemic.

Following the 2022 Russian invasion of Ukraine, the Food and Agriculture Organization, as well as other observers of the food commodities markets, warned of a collapse in food supply and price increases. Much of the concern is related to supply shortages of key commodity crops, such as wheat, maize, and oil seeds, which could cause price increases. The invasion also led to fuel and associated fertilizer price increases, causing further food shortfalls and price increases.

Even before the invasion, food prices were already at record highs. As of February 2022, year-over-year food prices were up 20%, according to the Food and Agriculture Organization. The war further increased year-over-year prices another 40% in March. The compounding issues, including the Russian invasion of Ukraine, as well as climate-related crop failures, are expected to reverse global trends in reducing hunger and malnutrition.

Some regions, such as East Africa and Madagascar, were already experiencing drought and famine due to agricultural system failures and climate change, and the price increases are expected to make the situation worse. Even Global North countries that usually have secure food supplies, such as the United Kingdom and United States are beginning to experience the direct impacts of cost inflation due to food insecurity. Some analysts described the price increases as the worst since the 2007–2008 world food price crisis. Though initial international responses to the food crisis suggested that some suppliers or harvests may alleviate global shortages and price increases (e.g. a proposed influx of grain from India), as of January 2023 no international efforts have been effective at alleviating prices. The World Economic Forum's Global Risks Report 2023 described food supply crises as an ongoing global risk.

Overview 

The COVID-19 pandemic significantly disrupted food supply chains around the world, disrupting distribution channels at the consumption and distribution stages of the food industry. A rise in fuel and transport prices further increased the complexity of distribution as food competed with other goods.

At the same time, significant floods and heatwaves in 2021 destroyed key crops in the Americas and Europe.

Increases by region 

The price rises affected parts of Asia, Africa and Latin America particularly severely with Iran, Sri Lanka, Sudan, and Iraq seeing protests and food riots. Other countries that have seen food riots or are facing related unrest are Albania, Kenya, Indonesia, Peru, Ecuador, Panama, Argentina, Tunisia, and Lebanon.

Africa and MENA 

Price increases for certain staples, such as wheat, were expected to most severely affect countries like Egypt, Turkey, and Somalia in MENA and East Africa, which rely heavily on wheat imports from Ukraine and Russia. This is expected to further hurt prices in regional food markets, such as Ethiopia, Kenya, Somalia, and South Sudan.

The changes in the food market caused by the invasion of Ukraine further exacerbated existing drought problems in the already vulnerable Horn of Africa. In February, the World Food Programme (WFP) and UNICEF had already projected nutrition and hunger gaps for thirteen million people in East Africa. By March, the UN had expanded that number to 20 million people.

Iran

West Africa 

Oxfam, ALIMA and Save the Children warned that the food crises in West Africa could affect 27 million people, especially in Burkina Faso, Niger, Chad, Mali, and Nigeria.

During a visit in Nigeria, the Secretary-General of the United Nations voiced concerns over the war exacerbating the crises of food, energy, and economies in Africa as a whole.

On 2 June 2022, Chad declared a national food emergency.

Kenya 
Northern Kenya experienced the worst drought in 40 years that left 4.4 million people acutely food insecure, with 1.2 million facing emergency hunger levels. The U.N. Development Program said rising food and energy prices caused by Covid-19 and the Russian war in Ukraine hit Sub-Saharan Africa hardest. Kenyan chapati makers are shrinking the size of her dough balls to make ends meet.

Yemen 

The main cause of the famine in Yemen is the ongoing Yemeni Civil War. Aid often cannot effectively reach the population because of the blockade of Yemen by Saudi Arabia which started in 2015. 17.4 million do not have enough food and malnutrition levels in Yemen are among the highest in the world.

Asia

Bangladesh 

International Monetary Fund (IMF) forecasted Consumer Price Index (CPI) in Bangladesh to rise to 5.9% by the year 2022. The price of cooking oil, sugar, eggs and chickpeas increased sharply, which contributed a great deal to the inflation. According to the Bangladesh Bureau of Statistics, general inflation climbed to 6.17% by February 2022. Government officials link local prices to the global market situation and necessary stepstaken to stabilize price hikes due to these conditions. Experts see government failure behind the price hikes, with Russia's invasion of Ukraine pressuring inflationary tendencies further. Before the invasion of Ukraine, 95% of the cooking oil in Bangladesh was imported from overseas. The price of cooking oil per barrel was $700 then, it went up to $1,940 prior to the invasion. The price of liquified petroleum gas (LPG) also increased 12% by March.

Afghanistan 

Following the Taliban takeover, western nations suspended humanitarian aid and the World Bank and IMF also halted payments to Afghanistan. The Biden administration froze about $9 billion in assets belonging to the Afghan central bank, blocking the Taliban from accessing billions of dollars held in US bank accounts. In October 2021, the UN stated that more than half of Afghanistan's 39 million people faced an acute food shortage.

The price increases connected to  Russia's invasion of Ukraine may worsen the economic crises in Afghanistan that followed the US withdrawal. According to the UN, $4.4bn is needed to pay for increased food costs, with human rights experts calling on the US to unblock assets of the Afghan's central bank to ease humanitarian crisis.

India 

Six out of every 10 Indians are dependent on state-delivered subsidised food. Though early reporting and government policy after the price increases following the war in Ukraine for wheat suggested India was well positioned to export more wheat, by end of April a heatwave that is projected to decrease harvests, increasing local prices, and fertilizer price increases projected a shortfall rather than an export-friendly market. The decrease in harvests was largely driven by the 2022 Indian heat wave which is expected to severely reduce the wheat harvest, killing the plants during the final weeks where they are usually growing.

On 13 May, India, the world's second largest producer of wheat, prohibited wheat exports. IMF chief Kristalina Georgieva urged India to reconsider its ban on wheat exports.

Indonesia 
Extreme price increases for cooking oil sparked student protests and other civil unrest. The national government of Indonesia banned export of palm oil. As Indonesia is the largest producer of palm oil, and with a harvest decline in the second largest producer and neighbor Malaysia, the ban has caused severe global supply chain disruptions and further exacerbated the price increases caused by the loss of Russian and Ukrainian oil exports and failures of soy crops in South America. Following protests by palm farmers, the ban was lifted in late May after being in effect for around three weeks.

Sri Lanka 
Sri Lanka was much more harshly affected by the food crisis as it was already facing mass man-made crop failures due to a total ban on chemical fertilizer by President Gotabaya Rajapaksa, resulting in rice production in Sri Lanka falling by 40–50%, while other crops also suffered large losses with some even reaching 70% loss even before it was affected by the Russian crisis. The 2022 Sri Lankan protests escalated in part due to food shortages and post-COVID-19 pandemic inflation. By the time government reversed the ban on chemical fertilizer the Russian invasion of Ukraine had caused fertilizer prices to rise making it unaffordable for Sri Lanka which had defaulted on its loans after nearly running out of forex reserves. On 9 May, Sri Lankan Prime Minister Mahinda Rajapaksa resigned from his position after protests on the country's economic crisis turned violent.

Europe 

Europe's energy crisis and the 2022 Russian invasion of Ukraine caused significant price increases for European fertilizer and food industries. According to Julia Meehan, the head of fertilizers for the commodity price firm ICIS, "We are seeing record prices for every fertilizer type, which are all way above the previous highs in 2008. It's very, very serious. People don't realize that 50% of the world's food relies on fertilizers."

In 2022, Europe's driest summer in 500 years had a negative impact on European agricultural production.

United Kingdom
Starting on 21 February 2023, supermarkets in the United Kingdom, such as Asda, Morrisons and Tesco, began rationing fruit and vegetables. The Telegraph gave the cause as "poor foreign harvests and a domestic farming crisis". The shortages were expected to last several weeks, and in a YouGov poll, 61% of UK respondents said they had personally noticed or experienced food shortages in their local shop or supermarket during mid-to-late February. Research from Kantar showed grocery price inflation hit its highest level since records began in 2008, with food inflation reaching 17.1% in February.

North America 

North America was already experiencing significant shortfalls and supply chain issues connected to the 2020–22 North American drought and the 2021–2022 global supply chain crisis. The supply chain crisis was also one factor in infant formula shortages in the US.

Haiti 

Along with protests and civil unrest against the government of Haiti in response to rising energy prices and the rising cost of living, as well as armed gang violence and an outbreak of cholera, Haiti is experiencing widespread acute hunger. On 14 October 2022, the WFP reported that a record 4.7 million people (almost half of the country's population) are currently facing acute hunger in Haiti; using the Integrated Food Security Phase Classification (IPC) scale, the WFP classified 19,000 of those people as belonging to the fifth and highest level on the scale, the "Catastrophe" phase (IPC 5).

South America

Chile 
The 2022 food crises have added to the mounting inflation in Chile has experienced since 2020. Measured by the change in the Índice de Precios al Consumidor, the (IPC) in March 2022 relative to March 2021 indicated an inflation rate of 1.9%, the highest known since October 1993. Bread and meat prices increased as well as those of food in general. Cooking oil prices have risen, with a particular brand at a Santiago supermarket experiencing a 90% price increase from April 2021 to April 2022.

The inflation in food prices is thought to be behind an increasing number of supermarket credit cards issued in 2022 as well as increasing rates of supermarket credit card debt default. In April 2022, President Gabriel Boric announced a $3.7 billion economic recovery plan that included an increase in the minimum wage to help people deal with rising prices. Supermarkets belonging to Cencosud begun rationing cooking oil, rice and flour in late April.

Causes

Energy crisis 

Natural gas is a major feedstock for the production of ammonia, via the Haber process, for use in fertilizer production. The development of synthetic nitrogen fertilizer has significantly supported global population growth — it has been estimated that almost half the people on the Earth are currently fed as a result of synthetic nitrogen fertilizer use.

Since 2021, the 2021–2023 global energy crisis has spread to the fertilizer and food industries. According to Julia Meehan, the head of fertilizers for the commodity price agency ICIS, "We are seeing record prices for every fertiliser type, which are all way above the previous highs in 2008. It's very, very serious. People don't realise that 50% of the world's food relies on fertilisers."  The impact of agricultural input costs, including fertilizer and fuels, on food prices has been shown to be larger than the effect of the curtailment of food exports from Russia and Ukraine.

Russian invasion of Ukraine 

From 2 Feb to 1 April, Russia banned the export of ammonium nitrate (AN) to guarantee supplies for domestic farmers following the spike in global fertilizer prices, which were impacted by rising costs for natural gas. The conflict has affected virtually all economies, however, the most affected economies are in Europe and Africa. Most of these economies have explored to find alternative food supply chain partners and solutions in North America, South America, the Middle East, Australasia, and some regions of Asia and Africa that have been less affected by this conflict.

Effects of climate change 

Multiple heat, flooding, and drought events between 2020 and 2022 significantly hurt global food supplies and reserves. These weather events, which have been connected with climate change, made the food system less resilient to shocks like the war in Ukraine. Global reserves of wheat were extremely low at the beginning of 2022 because of these weather events. During the year 2022, many similar events connected to climate change continue to severely reduce agriculture production in the world.

Drought in the Middle East and North Africa (MENA) 

Climate change in Iraq is leading to increasing water scarcity which will likely have serious implications for the country for years to come. Additionally, Iraq's water security is based on the declining Tigris–Euphrates river system.

East African drought 

A drought in East Africa began in 2021 and further intensified in 2022, precipitated in part by the oncoming La Niña in 2022. Three rainy seasons failed in the Horn of Africa, destroying crops and killing large herds of livestock. In Somalia, five rainy seasons have failed, Kenya and Sudan were also strongly affected. The UN identified 20 million people at risk of famine. Both wildlife and livestock have been killed by the drought. The region is especially vulnerable because an extreme wet season caused the 2019–2021 locust infestation, which destroyed large regions of crops.

By early October 2021, nearly a year after the Tigray War started, Mark Lowcock, who led OCHA during part of the Tigray War, stated that the Ethiopian federal government was deliberately starving Tigray, "running a sophisticated campaign to stop aid getting in" and that there was "not just an attempt to starve six million people but an attempt to cover up what's going on."

82 million East Africans and 42 million West Africans faced acute food insecurity in 2021.

By the end of 2022, more than 8 million Somalis were in need of food assistance – roughly half of Somalia's population.

Madagascar drought 

In mid-2021, a severe drought in southern Madagascar caused hundreds of thousands of people to suffer from food insecurity. In October 2022, UNICEF contributed with $23 millions for children suffering from the famine, with a third of the population suffering from the disaster, according to researchers cited by the Financial Times.

North American heatwave and drought 

Drought significantly reduced harvests in North America including the United States which produces a quarter of the world grains. The years from 2020-2021 were the driest in centuries in North America. The production of crops in the Midwest declined by 20% in this period.

European extreme weather 

Droughts in Spain and Portugal during early 2022 led to 60-80% loss predictions for crops in some areas. The huge amount of precipitation in March and early April 2022 in mainland Spain provided relief but did not fully revert the ongoing meteorological drought. Fruit crops in most of Europe were damaged by a cold wave that caused freezing rain, frost, and snow during early budding, after a period of unseasonably early warm weather.

Additional drought in Italy, has reduced the flow of fresh water near the Po river, which is responsible for 40% of crop production in the country. Salt water intrusion is expected to greatly reduce the viability of crop production in areas near the delta.

In February 2023, the UK Government called the major supermarket bosses to discuss on filling the salads restock. As country is entering the pick shortage in third week. Some biggest Britain’s grocery shops, Tesco (TSCO.L), Asda, Morrisons and Aldi, restricted the supply of cucumber, tomatoes and peppers to customers, due to unreasonable weather conditions, which brought shortage in supplies from southern Europe and North Africa. The crisis worsened due to less winter production in greenhouse of Britain and the Netherlands  effected due to high energy cost. Both has effected the shortage of food in Britain Supermarket.

South Asian heat wave

Southern Cone heat wave 

A heatwave that deeply affected Argentina, Uruguay, Paraguay, and Southern Brazil caused yield declines for corn, soy, and other key grains, resulting in significant global commodity price increases. The heatwave further exacerbated an already dry season in much of the region. Drought made 28% of the agricultural territory of Brazil "no longer climatically optimal"

Australian floods 

A severe flood in New South Wales during February 2022 caused the complete destruction of soy and rice crops and 36% of macadamia nut production. Animal herds and farming infrastructure were also severely damaged by the flooding, which was the third major natural disaster to agriculture communities in the region.

Supply chain failures 

In a May 2022 editorial for the Guardian, environmental George Monbiot described part of the collapse of food supply, a problem of concentration of supply in a handful of supply chains through the "Global Standard Diet" making the food system vulnerable to critical failures. He compared the food system failures to the 2008 banking crises, in terms of similar structural problems of concentration of economic power.

In China, rolling lockdowns as part of a zero-COVID policy significantly reduced key agricultural inputs for important grain crops. Before that, China already maintained its food stockpiles at a "historically high level" in 2021, because of an ongoing trade war with the United States. The deal and negotiation with U.S. and Australia could also be prodding China to buy food reserves.

Ethanol for fuel

Ethanol fuel makes up about 10% of motor vehicle gasoline produced and consumed in 2021, and around 40% of corn grown is used for ethanol fuel in the United States each year. Because it is 33% less efficient than petroleum gasoline miles driven from ethanol is less than 10%.

Responses

China 
By the first half of the agricultural year 2022, according to the U.S. Department of Agriculture, China acquired 50% of the world supply of wheat, 60% of rice, and 69% of corn. China has maintained its food stockpiles at a "historically high level", contributing to higher global food prices. Bloomberg columnist Adam Minter wrote that "For China, such stockpiles are necessary to ensure it won't be at the mercy of major food exporters such as the U.S."

United States 

The Biden administration responded to the growing shortages in April by trying to increase US farm production. The US policy community was worried about China or other countries filling the food gap. Obstruction in the US Congress prevented new funding and resources for the crises. A group of 160 advocacy groups challenged funding cuts by the Biden administration and Congress to USDA programs.

On 18 May 2022, the US announced $215 million in development assistance to mitigate the crises. This was in addition to $320 million for the Horn of Africa.

Germany 

Germany is working on a proposal to phase out the use of biofuels produced from food crops by 2030. Up to 40% of corn produced in the US is used to make ethanol, and worldwide 10% of all grain is turned into biofuel. A 50% reduction in grain used for biofuels in the US and Europe would replace all of Ukraine's grain exports.

Russia

On 30 June 2022, Russia withdrew its troops from Snake Island in a so called "goodwill gesture" to not obstruct U.N. attempts to open a humanitarian corridor allowing grains to be shipped from Ukraine.
On 16 July, major news outlets reported that Kyiv is definitely a step closer to being able to export grain through its Black Sea ports after talks with Russia, facilitated by Turkey, and the United Nations. Russia was accused of blocking crucial shipments of grains from Ukrainian ports but claims its exports are impacted by economic sanctions. On 23 July, Russia shelled the port of Odesa which had recently been unlocked.

The first shipment since the grain agreement was set off for Lebanon, where the Sierra Leone-flagged ship Razoni carried the cargo of corn. As of August 20, the total number of vessels leaving Ukraine in accordance with the agreement reached 27.

On 14 September 2022, UN Secretary-General Antonio Guterres reiterated his concerns over a constrained fertilizer supply from Russia due to the 2022 Russian invasion of Ukraine and subsequent economic sanctions. According to the source, UN diplomats held discussions to re-open the Togliatti-Odesa pipeline carrying ammonia. President Volodymyr Zelenskiy had offered such a move in exchange for the release of prisoners of war held by Russia. But TASS news agency quoted Kremlin spokesman Dmitry Peskov, who dismissed such a idea, as saying  “are people and ammonia the same thing?”.

On 29 October 2022, Russia suspends participation in grain initiative.  However, vessel traffic will resume on November 3.

International organizations 
The World Bank announced a new $12 billion fund to address the food crises.

In May, the United Nations called for Russia to facilitate the reopening of Ukrainian grain ports to mitigate the global food crises.

References

2022 in economics
2023 in economics
Economic crises
2022–2023 crises
2022–2023 crises
Impact of the COVID-19 pandemic on transport
Impacts of the 2022 Russian invasion of Ukraine